Mutxamel or Muchamiel (in Spanish) is a municipality in the comarca of Alacantí, Alicante, Valencian Community, Spain.

References

Municipalities in the Province of Alicante
Alacantí